Shyamalal Babu Rai, known professionally as Indeevar, (also credited as Indiwar and Indeewar) (1 January 1924 – 27 February 1997) was one of the leading Hindi film lyricists in the 1960s.

Early life 
He was born in Barua Sagar of Jhansi district of Uttar Pradesh and grew up in Barua Sagar in Jhansi District. He moved to Mumbai to pursue a professional career as a lyricist.

Career 
He got recognition in Malhar in 1951, where he penned "Bade Armano Se Rakkha Hai Balam Teri Kasam" which was set to music by Roshan. He wrote over a thousand songs in over 300 films in a career spanning over four decades . Indivar also wrote songs for famous pop duo Nazia Hassan and Zohaib Hassan. Nazia Hassan's famous songs "Aap Jaisa Koi", "Boom Boom", "Meherbani", "Dil ki Lagi" & Zohaib Hassan's "Star" was written by Indeevar.

Major Hits 
Tum se Badkar Duniya mei  (kaamchor)

Nile Nile Ambar Par (Kalakaar)

Bade aarmano se rakhha hai (Malhar)

Roshan tumhi se duniya (Parasmani)

Paas baitho tabiyat (Punarmilan)

Hum ne tujhko pyar kiya hai (Dulha Dulhan)

Jo pyar tu ne mujhko diya tha (Dulha Dulhan)

Jis dil me basa tha pyar (Saheli)

Waqt karta jo wafa (Dil Ne Pukaara)

Har Khushi ho wahan (Upkaar)

Kasme waade pyar wafa (Upkaar)

Phool tumhe bheja hai khat me (Saraswati Chandra)

Chhod de saari duniya kisi ke liye (Saraswati Chandra)

Chandan sa badan (Saraswati Chandra)

Mahlon ka raja mila	(Anokhi Raat)

Taal mile nadi ke jal me (Anokhi Raat)

Koi jab tumhara hriday tod de	(Purab Aur Paschim)

Hai preet jahan ki reet sada	(Purab Aur Paschim)

Darpan ko dekha tu ne	(Upaasana)

Yuhin tum mujhse baat karti ho	(Sachha Jhoota)

Meri pyaari baheniyan	(Sachha Jhoota)

Zindagi ka safar (Safar)

Jeevan se bhari teri aankhen	(Safar)

Hum they jin ke sahaare	(Safar)

Nadiya chale chale re dhaara	(Safar)

Jo tum ko ho pasand 	(Safar)

Tere hothon ke do phool	(Paras)
 
He re kanhaiya 	(Chhoti Bahu)

Tum mile pyar se	(Apraadh)

Roop tera aaisa darpan me na	(Ek Baar Muskura Do)

Savere ka suraj tumhare liye	(Ek Baar Muskura Do)

Samjhauta ghamon se kar lo	(Samjhauta)

Sab ke rahete lagta hai jaise	(Samjhauta)

Dil aaisa kisi ne mera toda	(Amaanush)

Har koi chahta hai	(Ek Muthhi Aasmaan)

Tere chehre me woh jadoo hai	(Dharmatma)

Madhuban khushboo deta hai	(Saajan Bina Suhagan)

Hum tumhe chahte hai aaise	(Qurbaani)

Jeevan mitaana hai diwaanapan	(Aarmaan)

Pyar hi jeene ki soorat hai	(Aarmaan)

Hothon se chhoo lo tum	(Prem Geet)

Dushman na kare dost ne  (Aakhir Kiyun)

Tum Mile Dil Khile (Criminal)

Jab Koi Baat Bigad Jaye (Jurm)

Ek tu na mila (Himalaya ki god me)

Awards 

|-
| 1966
| "Ek Tu Na Mila" (Himalaya Ki God Mein)
| rowspan="5"|Filmfare Best Lyricist Award
| 
|-
| 1974
| "Samjhauta Ghamon Se Kar Lo" (Samjhauta)
| 
|-
| 1975
| "Behnane Bhai Ki Kalai" (Resham Ki Dori)
| 
|-
| 1976
| "Dil Aisa Kisi Ne Mera Toda" (Amanush)
| 
|-
| 1985
| "Pyar Ka Tohfa Tera" (Tohfa)
| 
|}

Discography

See also 
 Bollywood songs
 Shakeel Badayuni
 Hasrat Jaipuri
 Shankar Jaikishan
 Shailendra
 Majrooh Sultanpuri
 Gulzar

References

External links 
 
 Indeevar

1924 births
1997 deaths
Hindi-language lyricists
People from Jhansi district
Filmfare Awards winners
20th-century Indian musicians